The Best of Kirsty MacColl is a compilation album by British singer-songwriter Kirsty MacColl. It was released by EMI in 2005 and reached No. 12 in the UK. The one-disc compilation, which was aimed at more casual fans of MacColl, followed the release of the three-disc set From Croydon to Cuba: An Anthology earlier in the year.

Reception

Upon release, Andy Kellman of AllMusic described the compilation as a "scaled-down version" of From Croydon to Cuba: An Anthology and "an introduction to a brilliant career full of highlights". He concluded: "All of MacColl's well-known and extremely varied songs are here". Adam Sweeting of The Guardian considered the compilation "a reminder of MacColl's whimsical charm and musical audacity". Worcester News summarised: "This album is an admirable collection of her greatest work." Jack Smith of the BBC described the album as "a timeline revealing the true diversity of Kirsty's work and the minutiae of English life".

Track listing

Charts

Weekly charts

Year-end charts

References

Kirsty MacColl albums
2005 compilation albums